Babacar may refer to:
Babacar (name)
Babacar (band), a short-lived worldbeat supergroup
Babacar (Babacar album), a 1998 album by the band
Babacar (France Gall album), 1987
"Babacar" (song), a 1987 song by France Gall